Matt Stuart (1974) is a British street photographer. He was a member of the In-Public street photography collective. Stuart also works as an advertising photographer.

His books of street photography include All That Life Can Afford (2016) and Into the Fire (2020). His work has also been exhibited in solo exhibitions in Britain and the USA. Of note, his work also appeared in group exhibitions at the Museum of London (which acquired his work for its permanent collection), the Museum of the City of New York, France, Bangkok and Stockholm.

Life and work
Stuart was born in Harrow, north west London, in 1974. In interviews he has described his life as having been spent singularly and obsessively devoted to one interest after another, including skateboarding from 1986 to 1994, and kung fu, before taking up photography working as an assistant to a photographer for three years. From that experience, he turned professional by working for himself from 2000 onward. His personal street photography is his main focus, predominantly in London—his book All That Life Can Afford (2016) includes photographs made there between 2002 and 2015. He also works commercially as an advertising photographer, and leads street photography workshops. Stuart became a member of the In-Public street photography collective in 2001 and in 2016 was a nominee member of Magnum Photos.

Publications

Publications by Stuart
All That Life Can Afford. London: Plague, 2016. . With an essay by Geoff Dyer, "Why does he do this every day?". First edition of 1000 copies and 100 limited editions; second printing, edition of 1000 copies and 100 limited editions.
Into the Fire. Richmond, UK: Setanta, 2020. Edition of 1000 copies.
All That Life Can Afford. Second edition, re-designed and with a new sequence of images. London: Plague, 2020. With an essay by Dyer. Edition of 1000 copies.
Think Like a Street Photographer. London: Laurence King, 2021. . With text by Gemma Padley and a foreword by Derren Brown.

Publications with contributions by Stuart
Publication #1. London: Nick Turpin Publishing, 2009. Essays by Hin Chua, David Gibson, Michael David Murphy and Nick Turpin. Photographs by Stuart, Narelle Autio, Martin Kollar, Joel Meyerowitz, Tod Papageorge, Trent Parke and Garry Winogrand. Edition of 2000 copies.
Photography in 100 Words: Exploring the Art of Photography with Fifty of its Greatest Masters. By David Clark. London: Argentum, 2009. .
10 – 10 Years of In-Public. London: Nick Turpin, 2010. . Includes an essay by Jonathan Glancey, "Outlandish Harmony"; a foreword by Turpin; and a chapter each by Stuart and other In-Public photographers.
Street Photography Now. London: Thames & Hudson, 2010.  (hardback). London: Thames & Hudson, 2011.  (paperback). Edited by Sophie Howarth and Stephen McLaren.
London Street Photography: 1860–2010. London: Museum of London; Stockport: Dewi Lewis, 2011. . Selected from the Museum of London collection by Mike Seaborne and Anna Sparham. Published to accompany an exhibition at the Museum of London.
The World Atlas of Street Photography. New Haven and London: Yale University Press: 2014, . Edited by Jackie Higgins. With a foreword by Max Kozloff.
The Street Photographer's Manual. London: Thames & Hudson, 2014. . By David Gibson. Includes a profile of Stuart.
Failed it!: How to turn mistakes into ideas and other advice for successfully screwing up. London: Phaidon, 2016. By Erik Kessels. .
Unseen London. London: Hoxton Mini Press, 2017. . With photographs by and interviews with various photographers, and text by Rachel Segal Hamilton.

Exhibitions

Solo exhibitions
On The Way, main post office, Helsinki, Finland, October–November 2004.
KK Outlet, London, February 2010.
Look Both Ways, Leica Gallery San Francisco, February–April 2015; Leica Store Washington DC, May–? 2015;

Exhibitions with others or during festivals
Onto the Streets, Photofusion, London, 2006, then toured with the British Council. Curated by Stephen McLaren and Sophie Howarth.
in-public @ 10, Photofusion, Brixton, London, 2010. Travelled to Les Ballades Photographiques de Seyssel, Seyssel, France, 2011; Included photographs by In-Public members.
Street Photography Now, Third Floor Gallery, Cardiff, 2010. Photographs from the book Street Photography Now (2011).
Street Photography Now, shop windows throughout the Canal Saint-Martin area, part of Mois de la Photo-OFF, Paris, 2010. Gallery Lichtblick, Cologne, 2010; Uno Art Space, Stuttgart, 2011.
Derby Museum and Art Gallery, Format International Photography Festival, Derby, UK, 2011. Exhibition of photographs by In-Public members and the film In-Sight (2011).
London Street Photography: 1860-2010, Museum of London, London, 2011. Travelled to the Museum of the City of New York, 2012.
iN-PUBLiC: An Exhibition of Street Photography, Thailand Creative and Design Centre, Bangkok, Thailand, 2013. In conjunction with the British Council. Photographs by In-Public members.
In Public, Snickerbacken 7, Stockholm, Sweden, 2013. Photographs by In-Public members.
Pedestrians, Photomonth festival, Leica Mayfair, London, 2015.
The Magic Lantern Show, Deadhouse, Somerset House, London, during Photo London, 2016. Exhibition of prints by Stuart accompanied by projections of work by Marina Sersale, Bredun Edwards and The Lurkers.

Awards
2005: One of Photo District News's "PDN 30 2005: New and Emerging Photographers to Watch"

Collections
Stuart's work is held in the following public collection:
Museum of London, London.

Notes

References

External links

Stuart's profile at In-Public
"I love London so: snapshots of a bustling city – in pictures" – photographs from All That Life Can Afford at The Guardian
Miniclick meets Matt Stuart – interview with Stuart (video)
Conversations in Modernism by Ben Sherman: Part Two – conversation between Stuart and Ghostpoet (video)
Stolen Moments: Matt Stuart (video)

1974 births
Living people
Photographers from London
Street photographers
Magnum photographers
21st-century British photographers